The 10th FINA World Aquatics Championships were held July 12–27, 2003 in Barcelona, Spain. The championships featured competition in all 5 of FINA's disciplines: Swimming, Diving, Synchronised swimming, Water Polo, and Open Water Swimming.

Competition was held in the facilities all around the city: Palau Sant Jordi, Piscines Bernat Picornell, Piscina Municipal de Montjuïc, Club de Natació de Barcelona and Port Vell.

Schedule
Competition dates were:
Diving: July 13–19 and 21;
Synchronized Swimming: July 13–19;
Open Water: July 13 (5K), 16 (10K) and 19 (25K);
Water Polo: 
Swimming: July 20–27.

Medal table

Results

Diving

Men

Women

Open water swimming

Men

Women

Swimming

Synchronised swimming

Water polo
Men

Women

See also
List of world records in swimming
List of World Championships records in swimming

References
 FINA Official Championship Results History – Swimming (men) (Archived 2009-05-05)
 FINA Official Championship Results History – Swimming (women)
 Water Polo Results
 Swim Rankings results

External links
 FINA official website

 Official FINA results: Diving ; Swimming ; Open water ; Synchronised swimming ; Water polo 

 
FINA World Aquatics Championships
W
World 2003
2003
Aqu